One More Last Chance was Ray Stevens' eighteenth studio album as well and his second for RCA Records, released in 1981. The front of the album cover shows Stevens dressed in cowboy attire and at a bar with a pretty, flirtatious woman standing at his side. The singles "Night Games" and "One More Last Chance" (unrelated to the later Charley Pride hit and Vince Gill hit songs of the same names) were lifted from this album. The album was a pivot back toward more serious material for Stevens, as he felt that the novelty music he had been recording in the late 1970s was falling out of fashion; he eventually returned to novelty music in 1984.

Track listing

Personnel 
 Arranged and Produced by Ray Stevens
 Engineer – Stuart Keathley
 Recorded at Ray Stevens Studio (Nashville, Tennessee)
 Mastering by Randy King at Randy's Roost (Nashville, Tennessee)
 Photography – Slick Lawson
 Art Direction – Bill Barnes

Musicians
 Ray Stevens – vocals, backing vocals, keyboards, synthesizers, horns, percussion 
 Mark Casstevens – acoustic guitars, electric guitars 
 John Clausi – acoustic guitars, electric guitars 
 Dale Sellers – electric guitars 
 Hal Rugg – steel guitar
 Larry (Wimpy Wayne) Sasser – steel guitar 
 Stuart Keathley – bass 
 Jerry Carrigan – drums 
 Jerry Kroon – drums 
 Shelly Kurland Strings – strings 
 Lisa Silver – backing vocals

Chart performance

Singles

References

1981 albums
Ray Stevens albums
RCA Records albums